Liam Youlley (born 20 February 1997) is an Australian professional soccer player who plays as a midfielder for Marconi Stallions.

Career
Youlley made the bench for the first time for the Western Sydney Wanderers on 25 February 2015 in the AFC Champions League against Kashima Antlers, but did not feature in the match. He made his professional debut for the team in the last game of the A-League season on 25 April 2015 against Perth Glory. He joined Sydney Olympic on 26 May 2017.

In July 2017, Youlley moved to South African Premier Division side Maritzburg United.

Honours 
Australia U20
 AFF U-19 Youth Championship: 2016

References

1997 births
Living people
Australian soccer players
Australia under-20 international soccer players
Western Sydney Wanderers FC players
Sydney Olympic FC players
Maritzburg United F.C. players
Marconi Stallions FC players
Association football midfielders
A-League Men players
National Premier Leagues players

Australian expatriate soccer players
Expatriate soccer players in South Africa
Australian expatriate sportspeople in South Africa